This is a list of Mikoyan-Gurevich MiG-23 operators. Active operators are in bold

Operators

Military

As of 2021, the MiG-23 is operated by the air forces of Angola, Cuba, the Democratic Republic of the Congo, Ethiopia, Kazakhstan, Libya, North Korea, Sudan, Syria and Zimbabwe.

Algeria
The Algerian Air Force (Force Aerienne Algerienne) received a total of around 80 MiG-23s of various marks from the Soviet Union, with deliveries beginning in 1979 and all aircraft retired by 2004. 
4e Escadre de Chasse-Bombardement, Ourgla 
21e Escadre de Chasse-Bombardement, Laghouat 
27e Escadron d'Attaque (MiG-23BN)
28e Escadron d'Interception (MiG-23MS, MiG-23MF, MiG-23UB)

Angola
The Angolan People's Air Force (FAPA) received at least 80 MiG-23MLs from the Soviet Union. Additionally, aircraft operated by the Cuban Air Force and later Executive Outcomes mercenary pilots flew from Angolan bases. After the change of government in 1992, the Angolan MiG-23s were stored until 2005, when they were refurbished in Ukraine and upgraded to MiG-23MLD standard. Around 22 remain in service today.
Angolan People's Air Force (FAPA)
25th Air Combat Fighter Regiment
12th Fighter Squadron (MiG-23ML, MiG-23UB)
13th Fighter Squadron (MiG-23ML, MiG-23UB)
Angolan National Air Force (FANA)
25th Air Combat Fighter Regiment, Kuito
12th Fighter Squadron (MiG-23MLD, MiG-23UB)
13th Fighter Squadron (MiG-23MLD, MiG-23UB)

Belarus
Various units of both the Soviet Air Defence Forces and Soviet Tactical Aviation became part of the Belarusian Air Force (VPS) upon the USSR's dissolution. These included a single unit of MiG-23MLD fighters, as well as units operating other aircraft such as Sukhoi Su-27 fighters and Sukhoi Su-24 bombers, which retained MiG-23UB trainers on strength as trainers. All MiG-23s were retired from Belarusian service by 2001.

 VPS
 201st IAP, Minsk (MiG-23MLD, MiG-23UB)
 116th BAP
 Proficiency training flight operating MiG-23UB
 927th IAP, Byaroza (MiG-23UB)

Bulgaria
The Bulgarian Air Force began operating the MiG-23 in 1976. All aircraft were retired by 2004.

 Bulgarian Air Force (1978-1992)
 25th IBAP / IBAB, Cheshnegirovo (MiG-23BN, MiG-23UB)
 18th IAP, Dobroslavtsi (MiG-23MF, MiG-23UB)
 26th Reconnaissance Aviation Regiment, Tolbukhin (MiG-23MLD)
Bulgarian Air Force (1992-2001)
1st Fighter Base, Dobroslavtsi (MiG-23BN, MiG-23MF, MG-23MLD, MiG-23UB)
Bulgarian Air Force (2001-2004)
1st Squadron, Graf Ignatievo (MiG-23MF, MiG-23UB)

Côte d'Ivoire
The Ivorian Air Force purchased several MiG-23MLAE-2 fighters from a Bulgarian company. These were never flown in combat, and were impounded in Togo shortly after delivery at the request of the French government.

 Ivorian Air Force, Félix-Houphouët-Boigny International Airport (MiG-23MLAE-2)

Cuba

 Cuban Revolutionary Air and Air Defense Force
Mano de Defensa Aerea
Zona Aerea Oeste
 2a Brigada de Guardia "Playa Giron"
23o Regimiento de Caza, San Julián
232o Escuadron de Caza, San Julián (MiG-23MF, MiG-23ML, MiG-23UB)
Mando Aereo Tactico
14o Regimiento de Apoyo Tactico, Santa Clara (MiG-23BN) (FUERA DE SERVICIO)
141o Escuadron de Apoyo Tactico, Santa Clara (MiG-23BN) (FUERA DE SERVICIO)
incomplete

Czechoslovakia

Czech Republic

Democratic Republic of the Congo

 Congo Air Force, Kinshasa N'djili Airport (MiG-23MS, MiG-23UB)

East Germany

Egypt

Eritrea

Ethiopia

Hungary

Israel

India

Iraq

Iran

Kazakhstan
Upon gaining independence from the Soviet Union, the Kazakhstan air force inherited several MiG-23MLD fighters as well as MiG-23UB trainers integrated into MiG-27 squadrons. The MLDs were retired by 1999, but MiG-23UBs remain in active service as of 2022. For information on the Mikoyan MiG-27s in service with the Kazakh air force, see List of MiG-27 operators.

 Kazakhstan Air Force (1991-2000)
 129th APIB, Taldykorgan (MiG-23UB)
 134th APIB, Zhangiztobe (MiG-23UB)
 715th IAP, Loogovaya (MiG-23M, MiG-23MLD, MiG-23UB)
 Republic of Kazakhstan Air Defence Force (2000–present)
 604th Aviation Base, Taldykorgan (MiG-23UB)

Libya

Namibia

North Korea

Poland

Romania

Soviet Union
PVO (Soviet Air Defence Forces)
 Direct Reporting Units
2179th BRS / 4884th BRS, Bobrovka
148th TsBP i PLS, Savasleyka
18th TsBP, Krasnovodsk
116th UTsBP, Astrakhan
234th UTsBP, Sary-Shagan
678th Zabaikal'sky GvSIAP, Priozyorsk-6
Armavir Red Banner VVAUL, Armavir
713th UAP, Armavir
761st Polotskiy UAP, Maikop
Stavropol' VVAULSh
218th UAP, Salsk
VVS (Tactical Aviation)
 Direct Reporting Units
4th TsBP i PLS, Lipetsk
91st IISAP, Lipetsk
455th IISAP, Lipetsk
760th UAP
1080th UATs PLS, Borisoglebsk
1st GvIAPIB, Lebazh'ye
343rd IIAP, Bagai-Baranovka, Saratov
Chernigov VVAUL
701st UAP, Pevtsy
GNIKI VVS
333rd OIAP, Vladimirovka
4020th BRD, Lipetsk
4215th BRS, Dmitryevka
Moscow Military District
9th IAD, Kubinka
234th 'Prooskorovskiy' GvIAP, Kubinka
32nd GVIAP, Shatalovo
Baltic Military District
15th Air Army
Belorussian Military District
26th Air Army
Carpathian Military District
14th Air Army, Lvov
Central Asian Military District
73rd Air Army, Tashkent
Far Eastern Military District
1st Air Army, Khabarovsk
Soviet Naval Aviation
Pacific Fleet
169th GvSAP
169th GvOSAP, Cam Ranh, Vietnam
Northern Fleet
88th OMAPIB
Black Sea Fleet
841st MAPIB

Sri Lanka

Sudan

Syria

Turkmenistan
After Turkmenistan's declaration of independence in 1991, the Turkmen Air Force inherited a number of MiG-23s from the Soviet 73rd Air Army, which remained in use until 2000.

 Turkmenistan Air Force
 55th IAP PVO, Nebit-Dag (MiG-23P, MiG-23UB)
 107th IAP PVO, Akdepe (MiG-23P, MiG-23UB)
 689th GvIAP, Türkmenbaşy (MiG-23P, MiG-23UB)
 VVS depot, Serdar (MiG-23M, MiG-23MLD, MiG-23P, MiG-23UB)

Uganda

Ukraine
Between 1992 and 2001, the Ukrainian Air Force operated around 200 MiG-23s, both single-seaters and MiG-23UB trainers.

 Ukrainian Air Force
 Southern Air Defence Region
 737th VAP, Chervonoglinskoye (MiG-23M, MiG-23MLD)
 Western Air Defence Region
 179th VAP, Stryi (MiG-23M, MiG-23MLD)
 894th VAP, Ozyornoye (MiG-23M, MiG-23MLD)
 114th VAP, Ivano-Frankivsk (MiG-23UB)
 642nd GvIAP, Martynovka (MiG-23UB)

Zimbabwe
The manner in which the Air Force of Zimbabwe received its MiG-23s is unknown, with some sources suggesting that they were donated by Libya while others say that the aircraft were acquired from the Democratic Republic of Congo after a failed Zimbabwean attempt to train Congolese pilots on the aircraft, which were donated by Libya. Regardless, at least aircraft, the sole MiG-23UB, remains in service today.

Evaluation Only

China
Six MiG-23s of various models were purchased by the Chinese government from Egypt during the 1970s.

 People's Liberation Army Air Force (MiG-23MS, MiG-23BN, MiG-23UB)

United Kingdom

United States

Yugoslavia

Civilian

Angola
Several MiG-23s were flown and operated by Ibis Air on behalf of Executive Outcomes mercenaries and the Angolan government during the Angolan Civil War.

United States
There are 11 civilian-owned MiG-23s registered in the United States of America according to the FAA. These include:
Two ex-Czech aircraft, N51734 and N5106E, registered for civilian use in the United States and based at New Castle Airport in Wilmington, Delaware.
 An ex-Bulgarian VVS aircraft, N923UB, which is operational and on display at the Cold War Air Museum near Dallas, Texas.

References

Mikoyan aircraft
MiG-23
Military history of Russia